Gabriel Luiz Sandes Gomes (born 22 January 2000), commonly known as Canela or Gabriel Canela, is a Brazilian footballer who currently plays as a forward for Zulte Waregem, on loan from Nova Iguaçu.

Career statistics

Club

Notes

References

2000 births
Living people
Brazilian footballers
Brazilian expatriate footballers
Association football forwards
Artsul Futebol Clube players
Nova Iguaçu Futebol Clube players
S.V. Zulte Waregem players
Brazilian expatriate sportspeople in Belgium
Expatriate footballers in Belgium